Samuel Wood Roberts (born September 6, 1983) is an American radio personality, podcast host, and WWE personality. Since October 2016, he has been the co-host of Jim Norton & Sam Roberts on SiriusXM Satellite Radio. Roberts was an intern and producer of the Opie and Anthony radio show from 2005 to 2014. He is also the host of Notsam Wrestling (f.k.a. Sam Roberts Wrestling Podcast).

Personal life
Roberts appeared on the 1990s television show  Figure It Out, where he performed his trick of quarter flicking from his ankle. From 2002 to 2006, Roberts attended Syracuse University, where he graduated with a major in sociology.

In February 2017 Roberts' wife, Jess, gave birth to their son David, named after Sam’s uncle. On the March 27, 2019 episode of Jim Norton & Sam Roberts, Roberts announced they were expecting a girl, who was born on May 16, 2019.

Professional career

Radio career
Roberts began his radio career in 2002 at WERW in Syracuse, NY. On June 13, 2005, he became an intern on the Opie and Anthony radio show on XM Satellite Radio, based in New York City. In 2006, he became the show's associate producer, followed by producer in January 2010. In April 2011, Roberts became the host of the pre and post Opie and Anthony radio show, and became the show's executive producer in February 2014. From June 2015 to October 2016, Roberts hosted Sam Roberts' Show.

In the fall of 2008, Roberts and East Side Dave started Special Delivery for Sirius XM; the show started as a pre-taped hour airing on Saturday nights, then became a weekly live show. In April 2010, Roberts became the host of an overnight Top 40 music show on SiriusXM Hits 1; the show lasted for four years. 

On October 4, 2016, Roberts joined  comic Jim Norton to co-host their morning program Jim Norton & Sam Roberts, on the Opie Radio channel (now known as Faction Talk) on SiriusXM.

Professional wrestling
Roberts began a professional wrestling podcast named Sam Roberts' Wrestling Podcast, in October 2014. In 2018, the podcast was renamed to Notsam Wrestling.

In August 2015 Roberts did a live edition of the Sam Roberts Show from Carolines on Broadway, prior to SummerSlam. The show was broadcast live on Sirius XM and included guests Brock Lesnar, Paul Heyman, and Corey Graves. The following year, Roberts again did a live show from Caroline's the week prior to SummerSlam, with Kevin Owens as his guest. Prior to SummerSlam 2017, Roberts once again broadcast live from Caroline's, with the moniker SummerSam III, with Mark Henry as his guest.

In September 2016, Roberts was featured over a two-part episode of Vince Russo's podcast, The Swerve. 

Roberts first appeared on WWE's pay-per-view pre-show panel at December 2016's Roadblock: End of the Line. He has since been part of the pre-show panel and other pre-show responsibilities for various WWE network events.

In December 2017 following Clash of Champions, Roberts made his debut as a host of WWE Talking Smack. Roberts later hosted the final Talking Smack following Fastlane in March 2018.

In January 2018, Roberts hosted the Raw 25 kickoff show.

During the April 15 taping of WWE Main Event, Roberts made his debut as a commentator. He has infrequently been a commentator on Main Event since then.

On April 1, 2020, Roberts made his guest commentator debut during NXT alongside Tom Phillips.

In October 2020, NotSam Wrestling on the WWE Network started its first season.

Other ventures
In 2006 Roberts did voiceover work as a radio DJ in Grand Theft Auto: Vice City Stories. Roberts made a cameo appearance in the 2014 film Top Five. In addition, Roberts made regular appearances on Red Eye between 2015-2017. In 2016, Roberts was featured on episode 37 of The Tomorrow Show with Keven Undergaro.

In 2019, he and Jim Norton appeared as recon spies on an episode of Bar Rescue.

References

External links

1983 births
American talk radio hosts
American podcasters
Living people
Place of birth missing (living people)
Professional wrestling announcers
Professional wrestling journalists and columnists
Professional wrestling podcasters
Radio personalities from New York City
Syracuse University alumni